Iliya Munin (born 16 January 1993) is a Bulgarian footballer who plays as a right-back for PFC Bansko.

Career statistics

Club

References

External links

Living people
1993 births
Bulgarian footballers
Association football defenders
FC Lyubimets players
PFC Beroe Stara Zagora players
PFC Litex Lovech players
FC Bansko players
FC Vereya players
FC Dunav Ruse players
FC Septemvri Simitli players
First Professional Football League (Bulgaria) players